The 2008 Madhya Pradesh Legislative Assembly election was declared by the Election Commission of India on 14 October 2008. Elections for 230 seats took place on 27 November 2008, and counting started on 8 December. The Bharatiya Janata Party won a majority of seats and Shivraj Singh Chouhan was sworn in as the Chief Minister for the second time.

Parties

The election was mainly contested between two national parties, Bharatiya Janata Party and Indian National Congress. Other parties included Bahujan Samaj Party, Bharatiya Jan Shakti Party, and Samajwadi Party

Result 
Source: ECI

Elected Members

References

2008 State Assembly elections in India
State Assembly elections in Madhya Pradesh
2000s in Madhya Pradesh